The 1933 New Year Honours in New Zealand were appointments by King George V to various orders and honours to reward and highlight good works by New Zealanders. The awards celebrated the passing of 1932 and the beginning of 1933, and were announced on 2 January 1933.

The recipients of honours are displayed here as they were styled before their new honour.

Knight Bachelor
 Alexander Gray  – of Wellington; president of the New Zealand Law Society.
 William Perry – of Masterton; president of the Royal Agricultural Society of New Zealand.

Order of Saint Michael and Saint George

Companion (CMG)
 Robert Sutherland Forsyth – New Zealand representative on the Empire Marketing Board, and representative in the United Kingdom of the New Zealand Meat Producers' Board.
 James Marchbanks  – lately general manager, and chief engineer, Wellington Harbour Board.

Order of the British Empire

Commander (CBE)
Civil division
 George Percival Newton – of Wellington; formerly under-secretary, Department of Internal Affairs.

References

New Year Honours
1933 awards
1933 in New Zealand
New Zealand awards